Taplow Choirs is a group of four professional youth choirs for young people which rehearse in the village of Taplow, UK near Slough. It was founded in September 2004 by Philip Viveash and Gillian Dibden MBE (Sainsbury's Choral Director of the Year 2002) after both conductors split from Berkshire Maestros (then Berkshire Young Musicians Trust). They held their first concert in the Christmas of 2004.  They frequently perform in venues such as Windsor Castle and other professional events around London, have been on international tours and won the BBC's choir of the year award.

Choirs

Taplow Children's Choir 
Founded in 2004 for children aged 6–12. The choir requires simple audition and is one of the top Children Choirs in the UK. The choir won the 'outstanding award' (first place) in the 2006 Music for Youth National Choral Festival Final in Symphony Hall, Birmingham by unanimous panel decision. They have also recorded for 'The Choir' with Gareth Malone on BBC television and are making recordings for Sing Up, the National Singing Programme.

Taplow Girls' Choir  
Founded in 2004 for girls aged 9–15. Entrance is via audition only. In April 2007 they took part in an International Choral Competition in Celje, Slovenia and returned to the UK with Gold and silver medals and the Adjudicator's Special Prize for the best performance in the festival of a compulsory set piece. In 2008 they were named as 'Choir of the Day' at the Area Selection stage of the BBC Radio 3 'Choir of the Year' competition.

Taplow Boys' Choir  
Founded in 2004 for boys aged 9–14, Taplow Boys' Choir started with only 6 members but slowly grew to its current membership of about 25. Entrance is via audition and voice test. In addition to their own concerts, Taplow Boys’ Choir has performed with a variety of groups which have included the Elgar Orchestra, the Adelaide Consort, Reading Phoenix Choir, Reading University Chorus  and the Laurie Holloway jazz trio.  In addition, Taplow Boys’ Choir has also supplied the boys’ chorus or soloists in performances with various adult choirs, including the St. Matthew Passion with both the Royal Free Singers  in Eton College Chapel and the Reading Bach Choir  in Reading Town Hall (Reading Museum); the Chichester Psalms and John Rutter Requiem for the Royal Free Singers; and Elijah for Newbury Festival Chorus and the English Chamber Orchestra.

Taplow Youth Choir  
Taplow Youth Choir was founded in late 2006 and accepts girls from age 16 and boys with broken or breaking voices from age 14.  Entrance is via audition only. The choir reached the Music for Youth National Choral Festival Final  in 2007 and won the 'outstanding award' (first place) in 2008. They were subsequently invited to sing in the 2008 BBC Proms at the Royal Albert Hall in London. The choir have also been on tour to Amsterdam and they annually sing evensong in St. George's Chapel, Windsor Castle. In 2008 they won the BBC Radio 3 Youth Choir of the Year competition, giving them a place in the Grand Finals in December 2008, broadcast on BBC television. In April 2009 the choir toured Estonia and took part in the 11th International Choir Festival in Tallinn where they were awarded third prize in the Youth and Children's Category.

References

External links 
 Taplow Choirs website

English choirs
Music in Buckinghamshire
Organisations based in Buckinghamshire
Musical groups established in 2004